Ioannis Kolettis (died 17 September 1847) was a Greek politician who played a significant role in Greek affairs from the Greek War of Independence through the early years of the Greek Kingdom, including as Minister to France and serving twice as Prime Minister.

Early life
Kolettis was an Aromanian, with a strong Greek ethnic identity. He was born in Syrrako, Epirus and played a leading role in the political life of the Greek state in the 1830s and 1840s. Kolettis studied medicine in Pisa, Italy and was influenced by the Carbonari movement and started planning his return to Epirus in order to participate in Greece's independence struggles.

In 1813, he settled at Ioannina, where he served as a doctor and after gaining standing he was recruited as the personal doctor of Ali Pasa's son, Muqtar Pasa. He remained in Ioannina till March 1821, when he entered Filiki Eteria and left for Syrrako, together with chieftain Raggos, in order to spread the revolution into Central Greece (Rumeli), but his efforts quickly failed because of the rapid reaction of the Ottoman army. Kolettis was the leader of the pro-French party and based his power on his relations with the leaders of Central Greece but also on his ability to eliminate his adversaries by acting behind the scenes.

Greek War of Independence

In the First Greek National Assembly, at Epidavros, he participated as the representative of Epirus and in January 1822 he became Minister of Internal Affairs. After the Second Greek National Assembly, at Astros in May 1823 he was appointed sub-prefect of Euboea and managed to remove Turkish troops off the island. At the same time, he continued his political activities, resulting in his election as member of the Legislative Body (Νομοθετικόν), a position that he held till 1826.

At the end of 1824, during the civil war between the rebel factions, he was in charge of the Roumeliot (Central Greece) party and defeated the Moreot or Peloponnesian party, which opposed the Kountouriotis government. Nonetheless, in the Third Greek National Assembly, he supported the Peloponnesian party and with its support was assigned to train troops from Thessaly and Macedonia, with the aim of destroying Ottoman resource depots at Atalanti. However, the whole operation failed because of his inexperience in military affairs, which ruined his reputation.

Political career after 1821
When Ioannis Kapodistrias landed at Nafplio in January 1828 as governor, he was appointed as governor of Samos and later, in July 1829 as Minister of Defense. In October 1831, Kapodistrias was assassinated; in the ensuing civil war, which lasted until 1832, Kolettis was once again leader of the Roumeliot Party. He tried, along with Theodoros Kolokotronis and Augustinos Kapodistrias to form a government but due to severe disagreements the coalition was dissolved. To assume leadership after 1821, he is considered responsible for the death of a great Greek Independence Hero, Odysseus Androutsos, and also responsible for the separation ("divide and conquer") of a legendary couple of the Greek Independence: Prince Demetrios Ypsilantis and Manto Mavrogenous.

Political career during Otto's reign
Until Otto of Greece reached adulthood, Kolettis was Minister of the Navy and Minister of Defense. In 1835, he was sent to France as the ambassador where he created connections with French politicians and intellectuals. He returned to Greece after the coup that broke out in Athens in September 1843, which forced King Otto to grant a constitution and Kolettis took part in the subsequent Constitutional Assembly. To contest the elections in 1844, he formed a party, the French Party (Γαλλικό Κόμμα) and together with Andreas Metaxas, leader of the Russian Party formed a government. When Metaxas resigned, he became Prime Minister and served as such until his death in 1847.  He is credited with conceiving the Megali Idea or "Great Idea" which became the core of Greek foreign policy until the early 20th century.

References

External link

Year of birth missing
1847 deaths
19th-century heads of state of Greece
19th-century prime ministers of Greece
19th-century Greek physicians
Greek people of Aromanian descent
Pro-Greek Aromanians
Aromanian politicians
French Party politicians
Prime Ministers of Greece
Foreign ministers of Greece
Ministers of Naval Affairs of Greece
Greek revolutionaries
Greek military leaders of the Greek War of Independence
Ambassadors of Greece to France
Ministers of the Interior of Greece
Ministers of Military Affairs of Greece
University of Pisa alumni
Megali Idea
Ali Pasha of Ioannina
People from Ioannina (regional unit)
Justice ministers of Greece